Aspidoscelis parvisocius, the Mexican pigmy whiptail, is a species of teiid lizard endemic to Mexico.

References

parvisocius
Reptiles described in 1960
Taxa named by Richard G. Zweifel
Reptiles of Mexico
Taxobox binomials not recognized by IUCN